Agaricus freirei is a species of fungus in the family Agaricaceae. Agaricus freirei closely resembles A. hondensis, and, based on similarities in DNA sequences, is a close relative. Described as new to science in 2001, A. freirei is found in coastal regions of Spain.

See also

List of Agaricus species

References

External links

freirei
Fungi described in 2001
Fungi of Europe